Visa requirements for Moroccan citizens are administrative entry restrictions by the authorities of other states placed on citizens of Morocco. As of 25 October 2021, Moroccan citizens had visa-free or visa on arrival access to 64 countries and territories, ranking the Moroccan passport 85th in terms of travel freedom (tied with the passport of Cuba and Sierra Leone) according to the Henley Passport Index.

Visa requirements map

Visa requirements

Dependent, Disputed, or Restricted territories
Unrecognized or partially recognized countries

Dependent and autonomous territories

See also

 Visa policy of Morocco
 Moroccan passport

References and Notes
References

Notes

Foreign relations of Morocco
Morocco